"Global Neighborhood Watch" is an article by Neal Stephenson that appeared in Wired Magazine in 1998.  In it he proposes a specific plan for using information technology to fight crime. According to Stephenson, he is no longer pursuing the idea.

References

External links
Wired article
1995 interview with Neal Stephenson regarding Global Neighborhood Watch
Alternative source for the text of the article

1998 documents
Essays by Neal Stephenson
Wired (magazine) articles